James Patrick Bree (born 11 December 1997) is an English professional footballer who plays as a right-back for Premier League club Southampton.

Career

Barnsley
Bree began his career with Barnsley and made his professional debut on 3 May 2014 in a 3–2 home defeat to Queens Park Rangers, becoming the club's second youngest debutant.

Aston Villa
Bree signed for Aston Villa on 25 January 2017 on a four-and-a-half-year contract for an undisclosed fee, described by Barnsley as "substantial". He made his debut for Aston Villa on 4 February in a 2–1 away defeat to Nottingham Forest.

He joined another Championship club, Ipswich Town, on 31 January 2019 on loan until the end of the season. His debut came three days later in a 1–0 defeat at home to Sheffield Wednesday.

Luton Town
Following Aston Villa's promotion to the Premier League, Bree was loaned to Luton Town, who were newly promoted to the Championship, on 8 August 2019 on a season-long loan. He made his Luton debut as a 74th-minute substitute for Martin Cranie in a 2–1 away defeat to Cardiff City two days later. Bree contributed five assists as Luton avoided relegation to League One on the final day of the season.

Bree completed a permanent transfer to Luton on 1 September 2020.

Southampton 
On 26 January 2023, Bree signed a three-and-a-half-year contract with Southampton.

Career statistics

Honours
Barnsley
Football League Trophy: 2015–16

References

External links
Profile at the Luton Town F.C. website

1997 births
Living people
Footballers from Wakefield
English footballers
Association football defenders
Barnsley F.C. players
Aston Villa F.C. players
Ipswich Town F.C. players
Luton Town F.C. players
Southampton F.C. players
English Football League players